Allan Sidney McLeod (born June 17, 1949) is a Canadian former professional ice hockey player who played 342 games in the World Hockey Association and 26 games in the National Hockey League between 1974 and 1979. He played for the Indianapolis Racers, Phoenix Roadrunners, Detroit Red Wings and Houston Aeros.

Career statistics

Regular season and playoffs

External links
 

1949 births
Living people
Canadian expatriate ice hockey players in the United States
Canadian ice hockey defencemen
Detroit Red Wings players
Fort Worth Wings players
Houston Aeros (WHA) players
Ice hockey people from Alberta
Indianapolis Racers players
Michigan Tech Huskies men's ice hockey players
Phoenix Roadrunners (WHA) players
Port Huron Wings players
Sportspeople from Medicine Hat
Virginia Wings players
Undrafted National Hockey League players